The Chung-Hua Institution for Economic Research (CIER) is a Taiwan-based international policy think tank for economic and industry-related research. It conducts both public research and fee-supported research.

History
After the ending of diplomatic relations between the Republic of China and the United States in 1979, the Government of the Republic of China drew up a very crucial measures for financial and economic reform. Among them was the proposal to establish an independent research institution with government funding and financial support from the industrial and business sectors. The legal entity was to undertake the task of studying the local and international economic situation and to offer policy recommendations to the government.

After the project was approved, the Executive Yuan entrusted the Council for Economic Planning and Development to guide and plan the institution's establishment. On 1 February 1980, the council formed the preparatory body and it was named the Preparatory Commission for Chung-Hua Institution for Economic Research. CIER was finally established on 1 July 1981.

Organizational structure
 The First Research Division
 The Second Research Division
 The Third Research Division
 The Center for Economic Forecasting
 Taiwan WTO and RTA Center
 The Center for Financial and Economic Strategies
 The Regional Development Study Center
 The Center for Energy and Environmental Research
 The Center for Science and Technology Policy Evaluation and Research
 The Taiwan ASEAN Studies Center
 The Center for Small and Medium Enterprise Research
 The Japan Center Sub-Committee
 The Center for Green Economy
 Secretarial Section
 Library
 Data Processing Office
 Publication Office

See also
Economy of Taiwan
Taiwan Institute of Economic Research
Institute of Economics, Academia Sinica
Mai Chao-cheng, president of the institution from 1986 to 1992
KAIST College of Business' School of Business and Technology Management.

References

External links 

1981 establishments in Taiwan
Economic research institutes in Taiwan
Think tanks based in Taiwan
Organizations established in 1981